is a Japanese football player currently playing for JEF United Chiba.

Club career stats
Updated to 2 December 2018.

1Includes Japanese Super Cup, Pan-Pacific Championship, Suruga Bank Championship and FIFA Club World Cup.

Team honours
AFC Champions League – 2008
Pan-Pacific Championship – 2008
Emperor's Cup – 2008, 2009

References

External links

Profile at Yokohama F. Marinos 

1988 births
Living people
Association football people from Osaka Prefecture
People from Minoh, Osaka
Japanese footballers
J1 League players
Gamba Osaka players
Omiya Ardija players
Yokohama F. Marinos players
JEF United Chiba players
Association football defenders